Kai Schwertfeger (born 8 September 1988) is a German former professional footballer who played as a defensive midfielder.

Career
Schwertfeger began his career with the youth team of Mettmanner SC and signed in summer 1997 an youth contract for Fortuna Düsseldorf. He made his professional debut for Fortuna Düsseldorf on 13 May 2008 in the Regionalliga Nord against VfL Wolfsburg II.

References

External links
 

1988 births
Living people
Footballers from Düsseldorf
Association football midfielders
German footballers
Fortuna Düsseldorf players
Alemannia Aachen players
Karlsruher SC players
FC Hansa Rostock players
Wuppertaler SV players
KFC Uerdingen 05 players
SV 19 Straelen players
SSVg Velbert players
2. Bundesliga players
3. Liga players
Regionalliga players